Leonard Jarvis, Jr. (October 19, 1781 – September 18, 1854) was an American businessman and politician who served as a member of the United States House of Representatives from Maine. Jarvis was the son of Leonard Jarvis, Sr. and Susan (Scott) Jarvis,  he was born in Boston, Massachusetts on October 19, 1781. He attended the common schools, graduated from Harvard in 1800.  After his graduation from Harvard, Jarvis moved to France, he lived in France for the next sixteen years.   In 1816, he moved to Surry, Maine.  On August 15, 1816, he married Mary Hubbard Greene in Boston, Massachusetts, she died in November 1841.  In about 1844, he married Anna Howard Spooner, (she died in 1888 or 1889 in California at the age of one hundred and one).

He was the sheriff of Hancock County, Maine from 1821 to 1829. He was a collector of customs for the Penobscot district from 1829 to 1831.

He was elected as a Jacksonian to the Twenty-first Congress and the three succeeding Congresses. He served from March 4, 1829 to March 3, 1837. During the Twenty-fourth Congress, he was the chairman of the United States House Committee on Naval Affairs.  In 1835, Jarvis challenged Francis O. J. Smith to a duel, Smith declined.

He was a Navy agent for the port of Boston from 1838 to 1841.

Death and burial
He returned to Surry, Maine, where he died on September 18, 1854.  He was interred in Hillside Cemetery. He is buried at Columbia Masonic Cemetery, where the Hillside Cemetery was moved to in 1855.

Notes

 

1781 births
1854 deaths
Harvard University alumni
People from Surry, Maine
Politicians from Boston
Maine Democratic-Republicans
Maine sheriffs
Jacksonian members of the United States House of Representatives from Maine
19th-century American politicians